Cheshmeh Shirin (also Romanized as Cheshmeh Shīrīn) is a village in Shurab Rural District, in the Central District of Arsanjan County, Fars Province, Iran. At the 2006 census, its population was 138, in 33 families.

References 

Populated places in Arsanjan County